Robert Rooba (born 2 September 1993) is an Estonian professional ice hockey left winger who currently plays for JYP of the Liiga.

Rooba also represents Estonia in international hockey competitions, serving as team captain.

Playing career
Rooba began playing hockey with HC Purikad. In May 2008, he relocated to Finland where he played for Blues youth teams. Rooba made his SM-liiga debut on 5 January 2012, at the age of 18, in a 2–3 overtime loss to Lukko.

On 18 January 2016, Rooba signed for Hermes of the Mestis for the remainder of the season.

On 27 April 2016, Rooba signed a two-year contract, with an option of extension for another season, with JYP of the Liiga. He won the 2017–18 Champions Hockey League with JYP. On 7 March 2018, Rooba signed a one-year contract extension.

On 1 May 2021, Rooba signed a one-year contract with Severstal Cherepovets of the Kontinental Hockey League (KHL). He scored in his KHL debut in Severstal Cherepovets' 2–3 loss to SKA Saint Petersburg on 2 September 2021, his 28th birthday.

On 12 May 2022, Rooba signed a two-year contract to return to JYP.

International play
Rooba debuted internationally for the Estonia junior team at the 2009 World Junior Championships. He recorded one assist as the team finished sixth in Division I and were relegated to Division II.

Rooba first played for the senior team at the 2010 World Championships. He finished the tournament with 3 goals and 2 assists, helping Estonia to win the Division II Group B and promotion to Division I. Rooba was named captain for the 2022 World Championships.

Personal life
Rooba's father, Jüri Rooba, was also a hockey player and is the current general manager of the national team.

Career statistics

Regular season and playoffs

International statistics

Honours and achievements

References

External links
 

1993 births
Living people
Sportspeople from Tallinn
Estonian ice hockey left wingers
Espoo Blues players
KooKoo players
Kiekko-Vantaa players
Kokkolan Hermes players
JYP Jyväskylä players
Severstal Cherepovets players
Estonian expatriate sportspeople in Finland
Estonian expatriate ice hockey people
Expatriate ice hockey players in Finland
Expatriate ice hockey players in Russia
Estonian expatriate sportspeople in Russia